The grand prix de littérature de la SGDL is a French literary prize created by the Société des gens de lettres in 1947 in order to reward an author for the whole of his work, and which is given during the spring session of the society.

Beginning in 1995, the prize rewards an author for a specific book.

List of laureates

1947–1994 

 1947: Louis Martin-Chauffier
 1948: Joseph Jolinon
 1949: Germaine Beaumont
 1950: Francis de Miomandre
 1951: Vincent Muselli
 1952: Claude Aveline
 1953: Gabriel Audisio
 1954: Franz Hellens
 1955: Jean Bonnerot
 1956: Henri Malherbe
 1957: André Beucler
 1958: René Béhaine
 1959: Jules Bertaut
 1960: Albert t'Serstevens
 1961: Raymond Las Vergnas
 1962: Marie Noël
 1963: Alphonse Séché
 1964: Maurice Rat
 1965: Pierre Lafue
 1966: Fernand Méry
 1967: Luc Bérimont
 1968: Jean Fougère
 1969: Georges Mongrédien
 1970: Lise Weill
 1971: Roger Grenier
 1972: Roger Bésus
 1973: Philippe Soupault
 1974: Geneviève Gennari
 1975: Emmanuel Berl
 1976: Pierre Boulle
 1977: Catherine Paysan
 1978: Georges Blond
 1979: Michel Peyramaure
 1980: Bertrand de Jouvenel
 1981: Charles Le Quintrec
 1982: Raymond Abellio
 1983: Jean Cassou
 1984: Claude Roy
 1985: Francis Ponge
 1986: Jean Tardieu
 1987: Yves Bonnefoy
 1988: André Dhôtel
 1989: Noël Devaulx
 1990: Robert Pinget
 1991: Pierre Gascar
 1992: Henri Thomas
 1993: Jacques Borel
 1994: Jacques Roubaud

Since 1995 
 1995: Bruno Gay-Lussac (prize declined by the author)
 1996: Georges-Emmanuel Clancier, Une ombre sarrasine, Albin Michel
 1997: Louis-René des Forêts, Ostinato, Mercure de France
 1998: Pascal Quignard, Vie secrète, Éditions Gallimard
 1999: Béatrix Beck, Guidée par le songe et Confidences de gargouilles, Éditions Grasset
 2000: Frédérick Tristan, Les Obsèques prodigieuses d'Abraham Radjec, Fayard
 2001: Daniel Boulanger, Les Mouches et l'Âne, Grasset
 2002: Pierre Bergounioux, Le Premier Mot, Gallimard, and Un peu de bleu dans le paysage, Verdier
 2003: Dominique Rolin, Lettre à Lise, Gallimard
 2004: Pierre Michon, Corps du roi, Verdier
 2005: Henry Bauchau, L'Enfant bleu, Actes Sud
 2006: Jacqueline Harpman, Du côté d'Ostende, Grasset
 2007: Gilles Lapouge, Le Bois des amoureux, Albin Michel
 2008: Patrick Grainville, Lumière du rat, Éditions du Seuil
 2009: Jean-Noël Pancrazi, Montecristi, Gallimard
 2010: François Emmanuel, Jours de tremblement, Le Seuil ; Joël Schmidt, Un cri pour deux, Albin Michel
 2011: Serge Doubrovsky, Un homme de passage, Grasset
 2012: Sylvie Germain, Rendez-vous nomades, Albin Michel
 2013: Hubert Haddad, Le Peintre d'éventail and Les Haïkus du peintre d'éventail, Zulma
 2014: Chantal Thomas, L’Échange des princesses, Seuil
 2015: Laurent Mauvignier, Autour du monde, Éditions de Minuit
 2016: René Depestre, Popa Singer, Zulma

External links 
 List of laureates on the site of the SGDL
 René Depestre lauréat du Grand prix de littérature de la SGDL on France Info (17 May 2016)
 Grand prix SGDL du premier roman on Livres Hebdo (8 November 2016)
 Grand prix SGDL de littérature pour l'ensemble de l'oeuvre - Session de printemps on Livres Hebdo (17 May 2016)

French literary awards
Awards established in 1947
1947 establishments in France